The Braille pattern dots-246 is a 6-dot braille cell with the middle left, and top and bottom right dots raised, or an 8-dot braille cell with the upper-middle left, and top and lower-middle right dots raised. It is represented by the Unicode code point U+282a, and in Braille ASCII with an open bracket: .

Unified Braille

In unified international braille, the braille pattern dots-246 is used to represent close-mid to open-mid back rounded vowels, such as /o/, /o̞/, or /ɔ/ when multiple letters correspond to these values, and is otherwise assigned as needed.

Table of unified braille values

Other braille

Plus dots 7 and 8

Related to Braille pattern dots-246 are Braille patterns 2467, 2468, and 24678, which are used in 8-dot braille systems, such as Gardner-Salinas and Luxembourgish Braille.

Related 8-dot kantenji patterns

In the Japanese kantenji braille, the standard 8-dot Braille patterns 358, 1358, 3458, and 13458 are the patterns related to Braille pattern dots-246, since the two additional dots of kantenji patterns 0246, 2467, and 02467 are placed above the base 6-dot cell, instead of below, as in standard 8-dot braille.

Kantenji using braille patterns 358, 1358, 3458, or 13458

This listing includes kantenji using Braille pattern dots-246 for all 6349 kanji found in JIS C 6226-1978.

  - 子

Variants and thematic compounds

  -  selector 1 + こ/子  =  孑
  -  selector 3 + こ/子  =  巽
  -  selector 4 + こ/子  =  共
  -  selector 5 + こ/子  =  呉
  -  selector 6 + こ/子  =  公
  -  こ/子 + selector 1  =  工
  -  こ/子 + selector 3  =  耒
  -  数 + こ/子  =  甲
  -  し/巿 + こ/子  =  黄

Compounds of 子

  -  龸 + こ/子  =  享
  -  る/忄 + 龸 + こ/子  =  惇
  -  き/木 + 龸 + こ/子  =  椁
  -  え/訁 + 龸 + こ/子  =  諄
  -  せ/食 + 龸 + こ/子  =  醇
  -  仁/亻 + こ/子  =  仔
  -  う/宀/#3 + こ/子  =  字
  -  ろ/十 + こ/子  =  存
  -  て/扌 + ろ/十 + こ/子  =  拵
  -  き/木 + ろ/十 + こ/子  =  栫
  -  く/艹 + ろ/十 + こ/子  =  荐
  -  と/戸 + こ/子  =  孝
  -  れ/口 + と/戸 + こ/子  =  哮
  -  の/禾 + こ/子  =  季
  -  せ/食 + こ/子  =  酵
  -  る/忄 + の/禾 + こ/子  =  悸
  -  こ/子 + ふ/女  =  好
  -  こ/子 + selector 1 + ゐ/幺  =  孕
  -  こ/子 + 宿 + ろ/十  =  孛
  -  こ/子 + ふ/女 + ゑ/訁  =  孥
  -  と/戸 + 宿 + こ/子  =  孱
  -  こ/子 + 宿 + ゐ/幺  =  孳
  -  龸 + 龸 + こ/子  =  學
  -  こ/子 + 宿 + 氷/氵  =  敦
  -  こ/子 + 龸 + selector 3  =  斈
  -  心 + 宿 + こ/子  =  李
  -  に/氵 + 宿 + こ/子  =  潺

Compounds of 孑

  -  こ/子 + こ/子  =  孤
  -  心 + こ/子 + こ/子  =  菰
  -  さ/阝 + こ/子  =  郭
  -  よ/广 + さ/阝 + こ/子  =  廓
  -  き/木 + さ/阝 + こ/子  =  槨
  -  こ/子 + を/貝  =  孔
  -  れ/口 + こ/子 + を/貝  =  吼
  -  こ/子 + ゐ/幺  =  孫
  -  ひ/辶 + こ/子 + ゐ/幺  =  遜
  -  こ/子 + 龸 + 氷/氵  =  孜
  -  こ/子 + selector 5 + ゐ/幺  =  孩
  -  こ/子 + 宿 + お/頁  =  孰
  -  こ/子 + ち/竹 + の/禾  =  孺

Compounds of 巽

  -  ひ/辶 + こ/子  =  選
  -  て/扌 + 宿 + こ/子  =  撰
  -  せ/食 + 宿 + こ/子  =  饌

Compounds of 共

  -  な/亻 + こ/子  =  供
  -  た/⽥ + こ/子  =  異
  -  日 + こ/子  =  暴
  -  日 + 日 + こ/子  =  曝
  -  に/氵 + 日 + こ/子  =  瀑
  -  火 + こ/子  =  爆
  -  む/車 + こ/子  =  翼
  -  ⺼ + こ/子  =  臀
  -  も/門 + こ/子  =  閧
  -  も/門 + も/門 + こ/子  =  鬨
  -  こ/子 + る/忄  =  恭
  -  こ/子 + の/禾  =  殿
  -  に/氵 + こ/子 + の/禾  =  澱
  -  や/疒 + こ/子 + の/禾  =  癜
  -  れ/口 + selector 4 + こ/子  =  哄
  -  て/扌 + selector 4 + こ/子  =  拱
  -  に/氵 + selector 4 + こ/子  =  洪
  -  む/車 + selector 4 + こ/子  =  蛬

Compounds of 呉

  -  ふ/女 + こ/子  =  娯
  -  く/艹 + selector 5 + こ/子  =  茣
  -  む/車 + selector 5 + こ/子  =  蜈
  -  す/発 + こ/子  =  虞
  -  え/訁 + こ/子  =  誤
  -  こ/子 + そ/馬 + 比  =  麌

Compounds of 公

  -  心 + こ/子  =  松
  -  に/氵 + 心 + こ/子  =  淞
  -  心 + 心 + こ/子  =  菘
  -  と/戸 + 心 + こ/子  =  鬆
  -  宿 + こ/子  =  窓
  -  い/糹/#2 + こ/子  =  総
  -  い/糹/#2 + い/糹/#2 + こ/子  =  總
  -  み/耳 + こ/子  =  聡
  -  み/耳 + み/耳 + こ/子  =  聰
  -  ゑ/訁 + こ/子  =  訟
  -  こ/子 + む/車  =  翁
  -  く/艹 + こ/子 + む/車  =  蓊
  -  こ/子 + 宿 + せ/食  =  鶲
  -  心 + selector 6 + こ/子  =  枩
  -  か/金 + selector 6 + こ/子  =  瓮
  -  ふ/女 + selector 6 + こ/子  =  舩
  -  む/車 + selector 6 + こ/子  =  蚣
  -  お/頁 + selector 6 + こ/子  =  頌

Compounds of 工

  -  そ/馬 + こ/子  =  差
  -  れ/口 + そ/馬 + こ/子  =  嗟
  -  や/疒 + そ/馬 + こ/子  =  嵯
  -  て/扌 + そ/馬 + こ/子  =  搓
  -  き/木 + そ/馬 + こ/子  =  槎
  -  へ/⺩ + そ/馬 + こ/子  =  瑳
  -  ま/石 + そ/馬 + こ/子  =  磋
  -  い/糹/#2 + そ/馬 + こ/子  =  縒
  -  み/耳 + そ/馬 + こ/子  =  蹉
  -  氷/氵 + こ/子  =  江
  -  ゐ/幺 + こ/子  =  紅
  -  を/貝 + こ/子  =  貢
  -  き/木 + を/貝 + こ/子  =  槓
  -  火 + を/貝 + こ/子  =  熕
  -  こ/子 + ぬ/力  =  功
  -  こ/子 + も/門  =  巧
  -  こ/子 + 氷/氵  =  攻
  -  こ/子 + う/宀/#3  =  虹
  -  こ/子 + お/頁  =  項
  -  て/扌 + こ/子 + selector 1  =  扛
  -  き/木 + こ/子 + selector 1  =  杢
  -  に/氵 + こ/子 + selector 1  =  汞
  -  ま/石 + こ/子 + selector 1  =  矼
  -  ん/止 + こ/子 + selector 1  =  缸
  -  ⺼ + こ/子 + selector 1  =  肛
  -  え/訁 + こ/子 + selector 1  =  訌
  -  き/木 + 宿 + こ/子  =  杠

Compounds of 耒

  -  こ/子 + い/糹/#2  =  耕
  -  こ/子 + え/訁  =  耘
  -  こ/子 + 宿 + ひ/辶  =  耙
  -  こ/子 + 宿 + ら/月  =  耜
  -  こ/子 + ぬ/力 + そ/馬  =  耡
  -  こ/子 + し/巿 + ろ/十  =  耨

Compounds of 甲

  -  や/疒 + こ/子  =  岬
  -  こ/子 + て/扌  =  押
  -  こ/子 + せ/食  =  鴨
  -  も/門 + 数 + こ/子  =  匣
  -  れ/口 + 数 + こ/子  =  呷
  -  け/犬 + 数 + こ/子  =  狎
  -  ⺼ + 数 + こ/子  =  胛
  -  も/門 + 宿 + こ/子  =  閘

Compounds of 黄

  -  き/木 + こ/子  =  横
  -  よ/广 + こ/子  =  広
  -  て/扌 + こ/子  =  拡
  -  ま/石 + こ/子  =  砿
  -  か/金 + こ/子  =  鉱
  -  よ/广 + よ/广 + こ/子  =  廣
  -  つ/土 + よ/广 + こ/子  =  壙
  -  日 + よ/广 + こ/子  =  曠
  -  ま/石 + よ/广 + こ/子  =  礦
  -  い/糹/#2 + よ/广 + こ/子  =  絋
  -  ち/竹 + し/巿 + こ/子  =  簧
  -  龸 + し/巿 + こ/子  =  黌
  -  き/木 + た/⽥ + こ/子  =  冀
  -  て/扌 + て/扌 + こ/子  =  擴
  -  の/禾 + た/⽥ + こ/子  =  糞
  -  か/金 + か/金 + こ/子  =  鑛

Other compounds

  -  つ/土 + こ/子  =  去
  -  る/忄 + こ/子  =  怯
  -  に/氵 + こ/子  =  法
  -  ぬ/力 + つ/土 + こ/子  =  劫
  -  に/氵 + つ/土 + こ/子  =  溘
  -  も/門 + つ/土 + こ/子  =  闔
  -  こ/子 + く/艹  =  告
  -  こ/子 + に/氵  =  浩
  -  日 + こ/子 + く/艹  =  晧
  -  き/木 + こ/子 + く/艹  =  梏
  -  え/訁 + こ/子 + く/艹  =  誥
  -  火 + こ/子 + く/艹  =  靠
  -  こ/子 + 宿  =  児
  -  こ/子 + こ/子 + 宿  =  兒
  -  め/目 + こ/子  =  睨
  -  な/亻 + こ/子 + 宿  =  倪
  -  そ/馬 + こ/子 + 宿  =  貎
  -  ち/竹 + こ/子 + 宿  =  霓
  -  も/門 + こ/子 + 宿  =  鬩
  -  せ/食 + こ/子 + 宿  =  鯢
  -  こ/子 + 宿 + そ/馬  =  麑
  -  ゆ/彳 + こ/子  =  弧
  -  け/犬 + こ/子  =  狐
  -  こ/子 + 日  =  暦
  -  こ/子 + ん/止  =  歴
  -  き/木 + こ/子 + ん/止  =  櫪
  -  に/氵 + こ/子 + ん/止  =  瀝
  -  や/疒 + こ/子 + ん/止  =  癧
  -  む/車 + こ/子 + ん/止  =  轣
  -  ち/竹 + こ/子 + ん/止  =  靂
  -  囗 + こ/子  =  向
  -  ひ/辶 + 囗 + こ/子  =  迥
  -  せ/食 + 囗 + こ/子  =  餉
  -  れ/口 + こ/子  =  喉
  -  ち/竹 + こ/子  =  筍
  -  こ/子 + と/戸  =  事
  -  こ/子 + こ/子 + と/戸  =  亊
  -  こ/子 + 心  =  怱
  -  な/亻 + 宿 + こ/子  =  偬
  -  る/忄 + 宿 + こ/子  =  愡
  -  ぬ/力 + 宿 + こ/子  =  刧
  -  へ/⺩ + に/氵 + こ/子  =  琺
  -  日 + 宿 + こ/子  =  皓
  -  こ/子 + う/宀/#3 + り/分  =  窖
  -  宿 + 宿 + こ/子  =  窗
  -  ゐ/幺 + 宿 + こ/子  =  絳
  -  そ/馬 + 宿 + こ/子  =  羔
  -  囗 + 宿 + こ/子  =  觚

Notes

Braille patterns